Christmas season usually refers to Christmas and holiday season, a seasonal celebration period surrounding Christmas and other holidays.

Christmas season may also refer to:

Advent, the part of the Christian liturgical year that leads up to Christmas Day
Christmastide, the part of the Christian liturgical year that runs from Christmas Day until either the feast of the Epiphany or the feast of the Baptism of the Lord
Economics of Christmas, the financial impact of the peak selling season for retailers in many nations around the world.